Karen Paulina Poniachik Pollak (20 April 1965 – 12 October 2022) was a Chilean journalist, consultant, and politician. She served as Minister of Mining and Energy during the first government of President Michelle Bachelet.

Poniachik was born in Santiago on 20 April 1965. Her grandparents were Jews who came to Chile from Romania and Poland to escape the Nazi siege that was beginning to feel strong in Europe in the early 1930s. Once in the South American country they devoted themselves to commercial and industrial activities. Poniachik's father was an active entrepreneur who went through various activities, such as industrial, textile and financial field. Her mother was a housewife who, after having four children, studied law.

Poniachik lived with her family in the Chilean capital until the arrival of the leftist Popular Unity to power in 1970, when they decided to immigrate to the United States. They returned home shortly before the coup of September 1973. She died on 12 October 2022, at the age of 57.

References 

1965 births
2022 deaths
Chilean Jews
Chilean women journalists
Chilean people of Polish-Jewish descent
Chilean people of Romanian-Jewish descent
Government ministers of Chile
Chilean Ministers of Mining
Ministers of Energy of Chile
Politicians from Santiago
Pontifical Catholic University of Chile alumni
Columbia University alumni
Women government ministers of Chile